Tkachyov, also transliterated as Tkachev, or Tkachyova/Tkacheva is a Russian surname, derived from the word "ткач" (weaver). Notable people with the surname include:

Alexander Tkachyov (disambiguation), multiple people
Anton Tkachev (born 1994), Russian politician 
Petr Tkachev (1844–1886), Russian revolutionary
Peter Andreevich Tkachev, Soviet TsNIITochMash engineer and Hero of Socialist Labour

See also
Tkachyov (village), a village (khutor) in the Republic of Adygea, Russia

Russian-language surnames